Gary Lee Shirk (born February 23, 1950) is a former professional American football tight end. He played with the New York Giants of the National Football League for seven seasons.  He also played in the World Football League for the Memphis Southmen and in the United States Football League for the Memphis Showboats.  Shirk played college football at Morehead State University.

Shirk attended Marysville High School in Ohio before moving onto Morehead State University where he was a four-year starter and was the team MVP in 1972. After playing for Memphis in the WFL in 1974 and 1975, Shirk moved on to the NFL, playing for the New York Giants from 1976 until 1982. He played in 101 games for the Giants, with 34 games started, and caught 130 passes for 1640 yards and 11 touchdowns before being released during the 1983 pre-season. From 1979-1982, his QB in New York was another former Morehead State Eagle, Phil Simms. Shirk also played for the USFL Memphis Showboats after his NFL playing days. Shirk was inducted into the Kentucky Football of Fame in 2010 and the Morehead State University Athletics Hall of Fame in 2014.

References

1950 births
Living people
American football tight ends
Memphis Showboats players
Morehead State Eagles football players
New York Giants players
Memphis Southmen players
People from Marysville, Ohio